The 1930 UCLA Bruins football team was an American football team that represented the University of California, Los Angeles (UCLA) during the 1930 college football season.  In their sixth year under head coach William H. Spaulding, the Bruins compiled a 3–5 record (1–4 conference) and finished in a tie for eighth place in the Pacific Coast Conference.

Schedule

References

UCLA
UCLA Bruins football seasons
UCLA Bruins football